John Gwynne, Gwynn or Gwyn may refer to:

Politicians
John W. Gwynne (1889–1972), Republican U.S. Representative from Iowa
John Gwynne (MP for Bath), English Member of Parliament (MP)
John Gwynne (died 1574), MP for Caernarvonshire (UK Parliament constituency)
John Gwyn, MP for Cardigan (UK Parliament constituency)
John Gwynne, MP for Wareham (UK Parliament constituency)

People in sport
 John Tudor Gwynn ("Jack", 1881–1956), Irish cricketer and reporter in British India
 John David Gwynn (1907–1998), Irish cricketer and civil engineer
 John Gwynne (commentator) (1945–2022), British sport reporter and commentator

Others
 John Gwynne (captain), Welsh  soldier
 John Gwynn (architect) (1713–1786), British architect and civil engineer
 John Gwyn (philanthropist) (1755–1829), Derry linen merchant and benefactor
 John Wellington Gwynne (1814–1902), Canadian lawyer and Supreme Court Judge
 John Gwynn (professor) (1827–1917), Irish Syriacist and Anglican dean
 John Gwynne (author), British writer of fantasy literature